Impact glue, contact glue or neoprene glue,  is a type of glue, used mainly to glue plastic foams, laminates, metal panels, etc. 
It also allows the mounting of supports of different types (metal on wood, cork on plaster, wood on cement, etc). Contact-type adhesives do not exclusively designate neoprene adhesives, but also all other adhesives characterized by high instant adhesion.

Special features 
Impact glue has a high adhesive capacity, and it is very resistant, it must be applied in thin layers. Impact adhesives are used in strong bonds with high shear-resistance like laminates, such as bonding Formica to a wooden counter, and in footwear, as in attaching outsoles to uppers. Natural rubber and polychloroprene (Neoprene) are the most commonly used contact adhesives. Both of these elastomers undergo strain crystallization.

Contact adhesives must be applied to both surfaces and allowed some time to dry before the two surfaces are pushed together. Some contact adhesives require as long as 24 hours to dry before the surfaces are to be held together. Once the surfaces are pushed together, the bond forms very quickly. It is usually not necessary to apply pressure for a long time, so there is less need for clamps.

Inhalation 

The neoprene glue is a well known inhalant, with effects that range from an alcohol-like intoxication and intense euphoria to vivid hallucinations, depending on the substance and the dose. Some inhalant users are injured due to the harmful effects of the solvents or gases or due to other chemicals used in the products that they are inhaling. As with any recreational drug, users can be injured due to dangerous behavior while they are intoxicated, such as driving under the influence. In some cases, users have died from hypoxia (lack of oxygen), pneumonia, cardiac failure or arrest, or aspiration of vomit. Brain damage is typically seen with chronic long-term use of solvents as opposed to short-term exposure.

Even though contact adhesives are legal, there have been legal actions taken in some jurisdictions to limit access by minors. While solvent glue is normally a legal product, a Scottish court has ruled that supplying glue to children is illegal if the store knows the children intend to abuse the glue. In the US, thirty-eight of 50 states have enacted laws making various inhalants unavailable to those under the age of 18, or making inhalant use illegal.

Presentation 
Neoprene adhesives exist in two forms, the so-called "liquid" form suitable for horizontal surfaces and the  thixotropic "gel" intended for vertical or indoor installation (gel does not flow downwards). 
It may be packed in a classic glue tube (domestic use), in a pistol cartridge or in a can for large quantities.

Possible confusion about names 
The neoprene adhesives discussed here should not be confused with the adhesives under the name "neoprene-type glue" that have certain characteristics in common with the former but do not have the same composition. The confusion related to the misleading name of these glues, as well as the difference in composition comparing "genuine" to these "imitation glues", can be very troublesome when joining certain materials. In fact, "neoprene-type glue" may be ineffective in situations where actual "neoprene glue" would be effective.

Precautions 
Most neoprene glues contain volatile and flammable solvents, it is prudent to use them in a ventilated room and wear a mask that protects the nose and mouth from vapors.

Application 
 Wet both surfaces with a spatula (thin, uniform layer of approximately 150 grams per square meter).
 If the support is porous, proceed with a double damping of the surface: the first layer will penetrate the support and the second will be ready to stick.
 Drying: allow to dry until the solvents evaporate (15 to 20 min.).
 When the adhesive film seems to no longer stick (at the touch of finger), perform the assembly. Attention, the adhesion is immediate.

References

Bibliography
 Ebnesajjad, Sina (2010). "History of Adhesives". Handbook of Adhesives and Surface Preparation:Technology, Applications and Manufacturing. Amsterdam: Elsevier. .
 Kinloch, Anthony J. (1987). Adhesion and Adhesives: Science and Technology. London: Chapman and Hall. 

 Mittal, K.L., A. Pizzi (2003). Handbook of Adhesive Technology. New York: Marcel Dekker.

External links

 Educational portal on adhesives and sealants
 RoyMech: The theory of adhesive bonding
 3M's Adhesive & Tapes Classification
 Database of adhesives for attaching different materials

Adhesives
Visual arts materials